The Lviv Metro is a rapid transit system that was planned in the city of Lviv in western Ukraine during the 1980s. During the early 2000s, the project was changed to utilize light-rail transport instead.

History
In the 1960s, plans for the construction of a high-speed, partially underground tram were included in Lviv's promising master plan. Its design began in the late 1970s. First of all, it was planned to build two tunnels with the dimensions of the subway under the city center, and to bring them to the land routes. The second stage envisaged the construction of a third tunnel from Ivan Franko Square through the Citadel, Bandera Street and the railway station to Yaniv Cemetery. In 1987, the first land section was built from Sakharova Street to Naukova Street. Underground construction began with the construction of the first ventilation shaft in the courtyard of the Potocki Palace, which damaged the surrounding buildings.Therefore, given this, as well as the financial crisis of the late 1980s, the project was frozen.

See also
Trams in Lviv
Lviv railway station

References

External links
 Про Львівське метро
 Львівське Метро

Underground rapid transit in Ukraine
Proposed public transport in Ukraine
Cancelled rapid transit lines and systems
Transport in Lviv